The 2016–17 English Football League  was the 118th season of the English Football League. It began on 6 August 2016 and concluded with the Championship promotion play-off final at Wembley Stadium on 29 May 2017. The EFL is contested through three divisions. The divisions are the Championship, League One and League Two. The winner of the Championship, Newcastle United, and runner-up Brighton & Hove Albion were automatically promoted to the Premier League and they were joined by the winner of the Championship playoff, Huddersfield Town. The bottom two teams in League Two, Hartlepool United and Leyton Orient, were relegated to the National League.

It is the league's first season after rebranding from the Football League to the English Football League.

Promotion and relegation following 2015-16 season

From the Premier League
 Relegated to the Championship
 Newcastle United
 Norwich City
 Aston Villa

From the Championship
 Promoted to the Premier League
 Burnley
 Middlesbrough
 Hull City
 Relegated to League One
 Charlton Athletic
 Milton Keynes Dons
 Bolton Wanderers

From League One
 Promoted to the Championship
 Wigan Athletic
 Burton Albion
 Barnsley
 Relegated to League Two
 Doncaster Rovers
 Blackpool
 Colchester United
 Crewe Alexandra

From League Two
 Promoted to League One
 Northampton Town
 Oxford United
 Bristol Rovers
 AFC Wimbledon
 Relegated to the National League
 Dagenham & Redbridge
 York City

From the National League
 Promoted to League Two
 Cheltenham Town
 Grimsby Town

Championship

Table

Play-offs

Results

League One

Table

Play-offs

Results

League Two

Table

Play-offs

Results

Managerial changes

References

 
2016-17